Umberto Zannier (born 25 May 1957, in Spilimbergo, Italy) is an Italian mathematician, specializing in number theory and Diophantine geometry.

Education
Zannier earned a Laurea degree from University of Pisa and studied at the Scuola Normale Superiore di Pisa with Ph.D. supervised by Enrico Bombieri.

Career
Zannier was from 1983 to 1987 a researcher at the University of Padua, from 1987 to 1991 an associate professor at the University of Salerno, and from 1991 to 2003 a full professor at the Università IUAV di Venezia. From 2003 to the present he has been a Professor in Geometry at the Scuola Normale Superiore di Pisa.

In 2010 he gave the Hermann Weyl Lectures at the Institute for Advanced Study. He was a visiting professor at several institutions, including the Institut Henri Poincaré in Paris, the ETH Zurich, and the Erwin Schrödinger Institute in Vienna.

With Jonathan Pila he developed a method (now known as the Pila-Zannier method) of applying O-minimality to number-theoretical and algebro-geometric problems. Thus they gave a new proof of the Manin–Mumford conjecture (which was first proved by Michel Raynaud and Ehud Hrushovski). Zannier and Pietro Corvaja in 2002 gave a new proof of Siegel's theorem on integral points by using a new method based upon the subspace theorem.

Awards & Service
Zannier was an Invited Speaker at the 4th European Mathematical Congress in Stockholm in 2004. Zannier was elected a corresponding member of the Istituto Veneto in 2004, a member of the Accademia dei Lincei in 2006, and a member of Academia Europaea in 2012. In 2014 he was an Invited Speaker of the International Congress of Mathematicians in Seoul.

In 2005 Zannier received the Mathematics Prize of the Accademia dei XL and in 2011 an Advanced Grant from the European Research Council (ERC). He is chief editor of the Annali di Scuola Normale Superiore and a co-editor of Acta Arithmetica.

Selected publications
 On the distribution of self-numbers. Proc. Amer. Math. Soc. vol. 85, 1982, 10-14  (See self number.)
 Some Applications of Diophantine Approximation to Diophantine Equations. Forum, Udine 2003. (69 pages)
 Lecture Notes on Diophantine Analysis. Edizioni Della Normale (Lecture Notes Scuola Normal Superiore), Appendix Francesco Amoroso, 2009. 
 Some Problems of Unlikely Intersections in Arithmetic and Geometry. Annals of Math. Studies, Volume 181, Princeton University Press, 2012 (with appendix by David Masser).
 With Enrico Bombieri and David Masser: Intersecting a Curve with Algebraic Subgroups of Multiplicative Groups. International Mathematics Research Notices, Vol. 20, 1999, 1119–1140. 
 A proof of Pisot's  conjecture. Annals of Mathematics, Vol. 151, 2000, pp. 375–383.
 with P. Corvaja: "A subspace theorem approach to integral points on curves", Compte Rendu Acad. Sci., 334, 2002, pp. 267–271 
 with P. Corvaja:  Finiteness of Integral Values for the Ratio of Two Linear Recurrences.  Inventiones Mathematicae, Vol. 149, 2002, pp. 431–451. 
 with P. Corvaja: On Integral Points on Surfaces. Annals of Mathematics, Vol. 160, 2004, 705–726. arXiv preprint
 with P. Corvaja: "On the rational approximations to the powers of an algebraic number: solution of two problems of Mahler and Mendès France." Acta Mathematica vol. 193, no. 2, 2004, 175–191. 
 with P. Corvaja: "Some cases of Vojta's conjecture on integral points over function fields." Journal of Algebraic Geometry, Vol. 17, 2008, pp. 295–333. arXiv preprint
 as editor with Francesco Amoroso: Diophantine approximation. Lectures given at the C.I.M.E. summer school held in Cetraro, Italy, June 28–July 6, 2000. Springer 2003.
 with J. Pila:  Rational points in periodic analytic sets and the Manin-Mumford conjecture.  Atti Accad. Naz. Lincei, Cl. Sci. Fis. Mat. Nature., Rend. Lincei (9) Mat. Appl., Vol. 19, 2008, No. 2, pp. 149–162. arXiv preprint

References

External links
 
 Academia Europaea
 Hermann Weyl Lectures delivered at the Institute for Advanced Study, 2010
  (Tuesday, May 4th, 2010)
  (Wednesday, May 5th, 2010)
  (Tuesday, May 11th, 2010)
  (Wednesday, May 12th, 2010)

20th-century Italian mathematicians
21st-century Italian mathematicians
University of Pisa alumni
Scuola Normale Superiore di Pisa alumni
Academic staff of the Scuola Normale Superiore di Pisa
Members of the Lincean Academy
Members of Academia Europaea
1957 births
Living people
People from the Province of Pordenone
Italian algebraic geometers
Arithmetic geometers